Udny may refer to:

 Udny Station, a small village in Aberdeenshire, Scotland
 Udny Green, a hamlet in Aberdeenshire, Scotland
 Clan Udny, a Scottish clan from Aberdeenshire, Scotland
 Udny Yule (1871–1951), British statistician

See also 

 Udney, a given name and surname
 Undy, a village in Monmouthshire, south east Wales
 
 EDNY (disambiguation)
 WDNY (disambiguation)